Hook nail is a bowing of the nail bed due to a lack of support from the short bony phalanx (fingertip).

See also 
 Half and half nails
 List of cutaneous conditions

References

Conditions of the skin appendages